Barnadesia is a genus of flowering plants in the aster family, Asteraceae. It is native to South America, where it is distributed from Colombia to northern Argentina, with most species occurring in the Andes. Common names include clavelillo, chivo caspi, espino de gato, and espino santo.

These plants are mainly shrubs and small trees, the largest exceeding four meters in height. The stems are spiny. The flower heads contain pink, red, or purple florets, including 8 to 13 hairy ray florets and usually either one or three disc florets. The ray floret yields a fruit with a plumelike pappus, and the fruit from a disc floret has a more "bristle-like contorted pappus".

 Species

References

External links
 Barnadesia. Preliminary Checklist of the Compositae of Bolivia. Royal Botanic Gardens, Kew.
 Miquel Bernades i Mainader | Galeria de Metges Catalans In Catalan

Barnadesioideae
Asteraceae genera
Flora of South America
Taxonomy articles created by Polbot